Two Latins from Manhattan is a 1941 American comedy film directed by Charles Barton and starring Joan Davis, Jinx Falkenburg, and Joan Woodbury.

Cast list
 Joan Davis as Joan Daley
 Jinx Falkenburg as Jinx Terry
 Joan Woodbury as Lois Morgan
 Fortunio Bonanova as Armando Rivero
 Don Beddoe as Don Barlow
 Marquita Madero as Marianela
 Carmen Morales as Rosita
 Lloyd Bridges as Tommy Curtis
 Sig Arno as Felipe Rudolfo MacIntyre
 Boyd Davis as Charles Miller
 Don Brodie as Advertising Man

References

External links
 
 
 

1941 films
1940s English-language films
Columbia Pictures films
Films directed by Charles Barton
1941 comedy films
American comedy films
American black-and-white films
1940s American films